

 or Ekiken, also known as Atsunobu (篤信), was a Japanese Neo-Confucianist philosopher and botanist.

Kaibara was born into a family of advisors to the daimyō of Fukuoka Domain in Chikuzen Province (modern-day Fukuoka Prefecture).  He accompanied his father to Edo in 1648, and was sent in 1649 to Nagasaki to  study Western science.  At his father's urging, he continued his studies in Nagasaki as a rōnin from 1650 through 1656.  He then re-entered service to Kuroda, which led to his continuing studies in Kyoto.  After his father's death in 1665, he returned to Fukuoka.

Kaibara's two most significant contributions to Japanese culture were the study of nature based on a blend of Western natural science and Neo-Confucianism, and the translation of the complex writings of Neo-Confucianism into vernacular Japanese. His synthesis of Confucian ideas and Western science influence the formation of Shinto, especially State Shinto, and reflect similar concerns to the Kokugaku movement.

Kaibara's science was confined to Botany and Materia medica and focused on the "natural law".  Kaibara became as famous in Japan as people such as Charles Darwin when it came to science. He advanced the study of botany in Japan when he wrote Yamato honzō (Medicinal herbs of Japan), which was a seminal study of Japanese plants. The 19th-century German Japanologist Philipp Franz von Siebold called him the "Aristotle of Japan".

Kaibara was known for his manuals of behavior, such as changing his Confucian ethical system based on the teachings of Zhu Xi (also known as Chu Hsi) into an easy "self-help" manuals. As an educator and philosopher, it appears that Kaibara's main goal in life was to further the process of weaving Neo-Confucianism into Japanese culture.  In this context, he is best known for such books as Precepts for Children and Greater Learning for Women (Onna daigaku); but modern scholarship argues that it was actually prepared by other hands.  Although the genesis of the work remains unchallenged, the oldest extant copy (1733) ends with the lines "as related by our teacher Ekiken Kaibara" and the publisher's colophon states that the text was written from lectures of our teacher Kaibara."

Published works
 Dazaifu jinja engi (History of Dazaifu Shrine).
 Jingikun (Lessons of the Deities).
 Onna daigaku (Greater Learning for Women), c. 1729.
 Shinju heikō aimotorazaru ron (Treatise on the Non-Divergence of Shintō and Confucianism).
 Yamato honzō (Medicinal herbs of Japan), 1709.
 Yamato sōhon (Grasses of Japan).
 Yōjōkun (The Book of Life-nourishing Principles), 1713.
 Taigiroku (The Record of Great Doubts), posthumously published in 1714.

See Also

 Confucian Shinto
Confucian Shinto

Notes

References
 Kaibara, Ekiken and Shingoro Takaishi. (1905). Women and the Wisdom of Japan (Basil Hall Chamberlain, translator). London: John Murray.
 Cranmer-Byng, L. and S.A. Kapadia, eds. (1914). Women and the Wisdom of Japan. London: John Murray.
 Ko, Dorothy, JaHyun Kim Haboush and Joan R. Piggott. (2003). Women and Confucian Cultures in Premodern China, Korea, and Japan. Berkeley: University of California Press.  
 Yonemoto, Marcia. (2003). Mapping Early Modern Japan: Space, Place, and Culture in the Tokugawa Period (1603–1868). Berkeley: University of California Press.

External links
 East Asia Institute, University of Cambridge: Further reading/bibliography
 National Archives of Japan, illustrated scrolls plus text by Kaibara Ekiken:
  Yoshinoyama shokeizu, guide to Mt. Yoshino, text by Ekiken (circa 1714)
  Itsukushima kakei,'' guide to Itsukushima, text by Ekiken (circa 1720)
  Tanngo no kuni Amano hashidate no zu, guide to Ama-no-Hashidate, text by Eiken (circa 1726)
 "Database of Pre-Modern Japanese Works" (National Institute of Japanese Literature): Books by Kaibara Ekiken

1630 births
1714 deaths
18th-century Japanese botanists
Japanese Confucianists
18th-century Japanese philosophers
Japanese writers of the Edo period
Neo-Confucian scholars
Pre-Linnaean botanists
17th-century Japanese philosophers
17th-century Japanese botanists